The 1969 World Judo Championships were the 6th edition of the Men's World Judo Championships, and were held in Mexico City, Mexico from 23–25 October, 1969.

Medal overview

Men

Medal table

External links
 results on judoinside.com retrieved December 12, 2013

World Championships
J
World Judo Championships
J